Zosimo Jesus "Jess" Paredes II (born May 27, 1948 in Manila) is a former Filipino politician.

Politics
Paredes was elected Assemblyman of Regular Batasang Pambansa representing Ifugao from 1984 until its dissolution in 1986.

He has twice ran for the Senate namely, the 1987 Senatorial elections under the Grand Alliance for Democracy, the same party of Joseph Estrada and Juan Ponce Enrile but placed 46th place and more recently the 2007 Senatorial elections under the Ang Kapatiran Party but placed 29th place.

He was the former head of Presidential Commission on the Visiting Forces Agreement (VFACom) later on resigned at the height of the Philippine government's perceived protection of convicted American rapist Lance Corp. Daniel Smith after the latter's transfer of detention from the Makati jail to the United States Embassy  compound.

Personal life
He is related to Horacio Paredes and Jim Paredes (one of the member of APO Hiking Society and a composer-singer). Paredes used to host two programs on DZXQ 1350:
Para sa Diyos, Bayan at Sambayanan — Weekdays 9:30am – 10:00am
Moral Force Radio — Sundays 9:00am – 10:00am

References

1948 births
Ang Kapatiran politicians
Kilusang Bagong Lipunan politicians
Living people
Members of the House of Representatives of the Philippines from Ifugao
Nacionalista Party politicians
People from Ifugao
People from Manila
Ferdinand Marcos administration personnel
Members of the Batasang Pambansa
Philippine Military Academy Class of 1971
Philippine Military Academy alumni